IV. Fliegerkorps (4th Air Corps) was formed 11 October 1939 in Düsseldorf from the 4. Flieger-Division. The Corps was disbanded on 16 September 1944 and its Stab formed the Kommandierenden General der Deutschen Luftwaffe in Dänemark (commanding general of the German Luftwaffe in Denmark).

Commanding officers
Generaloberst Alfred Keller, 11 October 1939 – 19 August 1940
General der Flieger Kurt Pflugbeil, 20 August 1940 – 24 August 1943
General der Flieger Rudolf Meister, 4 September 1943 – 16 September 1944

Chiefs of staff
Oberst Alexander Holle, 11 October 1939 – 19 December 1939
Oberst Josef Kammhuber, 19 December 1939 – 27 December 1939
Oberst Alexander Holle, 27 December 1939 – 31 January 1940
Oberst Hans-Detlef Herhudt von Rohden, 20 February 1941 – 30 September 1941
Oberst Torsten Christ, ? – 23 February 1943
Oberst Anselm Brasser, 23 February 1943 – 30 November 1943
Oberst Walter Storp, 1 December 1943 – 31 May 1944

References
Notes

A004
Military units and formations established in 1939
1939 establishments in Germany
Military units and formations disestablished in 1944